Deh Now (also Romanized as Deh-e Now; also known as Deh Now Naşīrābād) is a village in Khobriz Rural District, in the Central District of Arsanjan County, Fars Province, Iran. At the 2006 census, its population was 211, in 50 families.

References 

Populated places in Arsanjan County